Xavier Huillard (born 27 June 1954) is a French business executive, and the chairman and  CEO of Vinci SA. He has been CEO since 2006, and chairman since 2010. 

He graduated from École Polytechnique and École des ponts ParisTech.

He has worked for Vinci since March 1998, as deputy general manager, chairman of Vinci Construction, and chairman of Vinci Energies.

He has been the chairman of the Institut de l’Entreprise since 2011.

References

1954 births
Living people
Businesspeople from Paris
Lycée Lakanal alumni
Lycée Louis-le-Grand alumni
École Polytechnique alumni
École des Ponts ParisTech alumni
Corps des ponts
Chevaliers of the Légion d'honneur
French chief executives